Reverend Freakchild is a Colorado-based musician, singer, and songwriter, known for writing and performing a distinct style of the blues incorporating elements of psychedelic music, country music, and the blues.

History

Reverend Freakchild grew up in the U.S. state of Hawaii and was exposed to music at an early age, as his mother was a classical pianist and his father loved blues music. He attended Northeastern University in Boston, where he earned a degree in philosophy and religion, but decided to pursue music full-time.

Freakchild played in an early version of the alternative rock band Soul Coughing. Afterwards, while in Boston, he formed the roots rock jam band Bananafish. Other musical groups Reverend Freakchild has performed with include the Neptune Ensemble, the Soul Miners, the Lucky Devils, and the Cosmic All-Stars. He also has been a featured soloist and member of the Metro Mass Gospel Choir, with which he has performed at major Manhattan venues including Carnegie Hall, Avery Fisher Hall at Lincoln Center, and the Town Hall.

The Rev made a Buddhist pilgrimage to India in 2012 with Zen master Bernie Glassman.

Recordings
Reverend Freakchild released his first full-length album, Blues & Spirituals, in 2001, and released his second album, Hymn Hustler, in February 2003. In 2004, Freakchild released a collection of songs with the Cosmic All-Stars called Time Passes Strangely.

In 2010, Freakchild released God Shaped Hole. The album was generally well received by critics, with reviewer Ivan Nossa stating that the album is "like a garden with many flowers and every flower has its own beautiful color." Critic Mike Wood noted that Freakchild "holds genuine gold in his heart, and when he listens to his muse fully, "God Shaped Hole" is compelling and raw..."

In 2013, Chaos and Country Blues was released.  According to Freakchild, the album consists of "the stripped down blues sounds of love and death songs." The liner notes include a mock obituary of Freakchild written by Jon Sobel.  Hillbilly Zen-Punk Blues followed in 2015; Blues Blast Magazine stated "what of his music?  Like Zen Buddhism, it's contemplative and esoteric, meant to empty one's mind of worries and fears and fill it with peace."

Illogical Optimism was a 3-disc deluxe set released in 2016. Living Blues said about the album - "Reverend Freakchild is anything but reverent, rendering his unpredictable yet loving meld of blues, rock, and roots music with gusto."

Preachin' Blues followed in 2017, reaching #24 on the Living Blues Charts for January 2017.  Of Preaching Blues, Living Blues noted "Freakchild grounds his singing and playing in an informed understanding of the blues and of the spirit while interjecting his own worldview of how human beings should live."  In 2018, Freakchild released Dial It In to praise by Elmore Magazine - "they all get the body and soul moving—and smiling, since there’s a fair dose of humor in the songs, plus a spiritual bent, whether spiritual/gospel or spiritual/psychedelic." No Depression notes "when I want something fresh, progressive, experimental yet still full of the Blues I will reach out for Reverend Freakchild and friends." This album featured the single "Dial It In!" with G. Love, Hugh Pool, and Hazel Miller.

Freakchild's next release - 2019's Road Dog Dharma - was a collection of radio interviews and travel songs from around the USA.  This was followed in 2020 by The Bodhisattva Blues, featuring Melvin Seals, Mark Karan, Robin Sylvester, Jay Collins, Hugh Pool, and Chris Parker. “Spiritually positive songs, faithful covers, great choice of players!!” - David Gans, author and radio host (The Grateful Dead Hour).  His most recent release is the 13-song collection Supramundane Blues.

Personal life
In an interview, Freakchild mentioned that he is a Buddhist but that he also considers music to be his religion. Freakchild states that the blues and Buddhism can both be seen as ways of confronting reality and the truth of human suffering.  He also holds a Master of Divinity Degree from Naropa University (2020).

Discography

References

External links
Label page

American male singer-songwriters
American folk singers
American blues singer-songwriters
Living people
Singers from New York City
Place of birth missing (living people)
Northeastern University alumni
Guitarists from New York City
American male guitarists
Year of birth missing (living people)
Singer-songwriters from New York (state)